Šlapanice may refer to places in the Czech Republic:

Šlapanice, a town in the South Moravian Region
Šlapanice (Kladno District), a municipality and village in the Central Bohemian Region